Hopeton Lewis (3 October 1947 – 4 September 2014) was a Jamaican born singer of rocksteady and reggae, an arranger, and radio music presenter.

Biography
Lewis was born in Kingston, Jamaica.  He sang in church from an early age, and started performing as a youth, forming a singing group called the Regals. By the mid-1960s, he began recording and had one of the earliest rocksteady hits with "Take It Easy" in late 1966. The track was recorded with Lynn Taitt and the Jets, and is regarded as one of the first rocksteady singles. He had several more Jamaican hits in the late 1960s and early 1970s, including the first 'herb' song ever recorded there, "Cool Collie". He worked for Duke Reid as an arranger and backing vocalist, and won the Festival Song Contest in 1970 with "Boom Shaka Lacka". He began working as a singer with Byron Lee & the Dragonaires, and in 1971 had a hit with "Grooving Out On Life".

Lewis continued to release records, but his success after the early 1970s was limited. Lewis released This Is Gospel in 1996 on his own label, Bay City Music, founded in the 1980s. Much of his later work was in the gospel genre, including Reaching Out to Jesus (2000).

He lived the later period of his life in Brooklyn, New York, where he presented a show on Grace Deliverance Radio.

Lewis died on 4 September 2014 at his home in Brooklyn, aged 66, after suffering kidney failure.

The Disciples roots reggae and dub   musicians  have a record label entitled Boom Shaka Laka, named in honour of, and inspired by Hopeton Lewis' song (as well as by Jah Shaka and reggae culture and history in general). The Disciples also wrote a highly influential roots reggae fanzine called Boom Shaka Laka, also named after the Hopeton Lewis record. The author, Lol Bell-Brown ( who works for Dub Vendor  ) named the magazine after the Hopeton Lewis classic song, Boom-Shacka-Lacka. The first issue was released in 1988 and over the four following years the magazine became one of the most important publications to cover, for the time, the current roots scene as well as classic roots records. There were 11 issues released of which all are sought after collectors items.

Albums
Take It Easy (1968), Merritone
Grooving Out On Life (1971), Dynamic Sounds/Trojan
Dynamic Hopeton Lewis (1974), Dragon
All Night Bubblin''' (1985), BossLove, Life and Music (1997), Songs 4 LifeReaching Out to Jesus (2000), OrchardCaribbean Gospel Jubilee (2000), RockstoneInner Peace (2001), Songs 4 LifeA Holy Christmas (2002), Songs 4 LifeLove Life & Music (2007), QuartzHopeton Lewis Sings Home Coming Classics (2007), Songs 4 LifeHymns (2007), Songs 4 LifeThis Is Gospel (2008), Sun Moon & StarsWorship (2008), Songs 4 LifeLay Your Hands on Me Jesus (2008), Songs 4 LifeLove Ballads Vol. One (2008), RockstonePraise and Worship (2008), Songs 4 LifeThe Inspirational Hopeton LewisCountry Gospel (2008), Songs 4 LifeHealing: 42 Years of Music (2009), Songs 4 LifeAll Island Gospel Revival, Songs 4 LifeVoice of Thanksgiving, Songs 4 LifeSong's of Faith (2013). Songs 4 Life/VPDe Word Through Music (2014), Songs 4 Life/VP

CompilationsClassic Gold Collection (1998), RockstoneTake It Easy: Rock Steady Reggae (1999), K&K/VP40 Years: Happy Birthday: Celebrating 40 Years of Music'' (2008), Songs 4 Life

References

External links
Hopeton Lewis at Roots Archives

1947 births
2014 deaths
Musicians from Kingston, Jamaica
20th-century Jamaican male singers
21st-century  Jamaican male singers
Jamaican gospel singers
Jamaican reggae singers
Rocksteady musicians